The Oistins Fish Festival is a folk festival that has taken place in Oistins, Barbados every Easter since 1967. The purpose of the festival is to acknowledge the people involved in the fishing industry.

The name is expected to change in the 2020s, as Toni Thorne, chairman of the festival's organising committee, decided to change the name.

Overview
The festival includes arts and crafts events, along with a greasy pole climbing competition. The food and drinks served include fish, seafood, beer, fish cakes, pudding, and souse.

References

Food and drink festivals in Barbados
Folk festivals in Barbados
Cultural festivals in Barbados
Spring (season) events in Barbados